The 2014 Boston Red Sox season was the 114th season in the franchise's Major League Baseball history. The Red Sox finished last in the five-team American League East with a record of 71 wins and 91 losses, 25 games behind the Baltimore Orioles.  It was the second last-place finish for the team in three years, and they were the second defending World Series champions to finish last in their division, the first having been the 1998 Florida Marlins. They also became the first MLB team to finish last in one season, win the World Series the next, and finish last again the following season.

Offseason

November
On November 1, 2013 the Red Sox picked up their $13 million club option on their ace pitcher Jon Lester for 2014.
On November 11, 2013 Boston announced that Jacoby Ellsbury, Stephen Drew and Mike Napoli have all declined the qualifying offer from the club and hit the free agent market.

December
On December 3, 2013 the Red Sox signed catcher A. J. Pierzynski to a one-year, $8.25 million contract.
On December 3, 2013, just hours after Boston's signing of Pierzynski, catcher Jarrod Saltalamacchia signed a 3-year, $21 million deal with the Miami Marlins.
On December 3, 2013, a third and final offseason move culminated the day with an announcement with major implications for the league and free agency market. Outfielder Jacoby Ellsbury signed a 7-year, $153 million deal with the New York Yankees.
On December 12, 2013, the Red Sox resigned Mike Napoli to a two-year contract.
On December 18, 2013, the Red Sox signed Japanese pitcher Shunsuke Watanabe to a minor league contract with an invitation to spring training.
On December 18, 2013, the Red Sox traded pitcher Franklin Morales to the Colorado Rockies for infielder Jonathan Herrera.

January
On January 22, 2014, the Red Sox signed outfielder Grady Sizemore to a one-year deal, initially only worth $750,000 but with a possible $6 million in incentives. Sizemore had been out of baseball since 2011 due to injuries.

February
On February 16, 2014, one day after pitchers and catchers reported, Ryan Dempster announced he will not pitch in 2014.
On February 20, 2014 the Red Sox signed Chris Capuano to a one-year worth $2,250,000 contract with incentives to make the contract worth up to $5,000,000

March
On March 23, 2014, the Red Sox and David Ortiz agreed on a 1-year contract extension through the 2015 season worth $16 million with a club/vesting option for 2016 and a club option for 2017.

During the season

Opening Day

The 2014 Red Sox season opened on March 31, with a 2–1 road loss against the Baltimore Orioles.

Opening Day lineup

April
On April 7, the Red Sox signed infielder Ryan Roberts. He is designated for assignment 11 days later, but stays with the organization.

May
On May 21, the Red Sox sign Stephen Drew.

June
On June 18, the Red Sox release Grady Sizemore.

July
On July 1, the Red Sox release Chris Capuano.
On July 9, the Red Sox release A. J. Pierzynski.
On July 26, the Red Sox traded Jake Peavy to the San Francisco Giants for LHP Edwin Escobar and RHP Heath Hembree.
On July 30, the Red Sox traded Félix Doubront to the Chicago Cubs for a player to be named later (Marco Hernández).
On July 31, the Red Sox traded Jon Lester, Jonny Gomes and cash considerations to the Oakland Athletics for OF Yoenis Céspedes and a competitive balance draft pick. The Red Sox traded John Lackey to the St. Louis Cardinals for Allen Craig and Joe Kelly. The Red Sox traded Andrew Miller to the Baltimore Orioles for Eduardo Rodríguez. The Red Sox traded Stephen Drew to the New York Yankees for Kelly Johnson.

August
On August 1, the Red Sox release Mike Carp.
On August 22, 2014 the Red Sox sign Rusney Castillo to a 7-year, $72.5 million deal.

Season standings

Record vs. opponents

Roster

Game log

|- style="text-align:center; background-color:#ffbbbb;"
| 1 || March 31 || @ Orioles || 1–2 || Britton (1–0) || Lester (0–1) || Hunter (1) || Camden Yards || 46,685 || 0–1 || L1
|- style="text-align:center; background-color:#bbffbb;"
| 2 || April 2 || @ Orioles || 6–2 || Lackey (1–0) || Jiménez (0–1) || || Camden Yards || 25,708 || 1–1 || W1
|- style="text-align:center; background-color:#bbffbb;"
| 3 || April 3 || @ Orioles || 4–3 ||Doubront (1–0) || Chen (0–1)||Uehara (1) || Camden Yards || 20,880|| 2–1 || W2
|- style="text-align:center; background-color:#ffbbbb;"
| 4 || April 4 || Brewers || 2–6 || Kintzler (1–0) || Mujica (0–1) || || Fenway Park || 36,728 || 2–2 || L1
|- style="text-align:center; background-color:#ffbbbb;"
| 5 || April 5 || Brewers || 6–7 (11) || Thornburg (1–0) || Badenhop (0–1) || Rodríguez (2) || Fenway Park || 35,729 || 2–3 || L2
|- style="text-align:center; background-color:#ffbbbb;"
| 6 || April 6 || Brewers || 0–4 || Gallardo (2–0) || Lester (0–2) || || Fenway Park || 35,958 || 2–4 || L3
|- style="text-align:center; background-color:#bbffbb;"
| 7 || April 7 || Rangers || 5–1 || Lackey (2–0) || Scheppers (0–1) || || Fenway Park || 35,842 || 3–4 || W1
|- style="text-align:center; background-color:#ffbbbb;"
| 8 || April 8 || Rangers || 7–10 || Pérez (1–0) || Doubront (1–1) || || Fenway Park || 34,142 || 3–5 || L1
|- style="text-align:center; background-color:#bbffbb;"
| 9 || April 9 || Rangers || 4–2 || Miller (1–0) || Ogando (0–1) || Uehara (2) || Fenway Park || 33,585 || 4–5 || W1
|- style="text-align:center; background-color:#ffbbbb;"
| 10 || April 10 || @ Yankees || 1–4 || Pineda (1–1) || Buchholz (0–1) || Phelps (1) || Yankee Stadium || 42,821 || 4–6 || L1
|- style="text-align:center; background-color:#bbffbb;"
| 11 || April 11 || @ Yankees || 4–2 || Lester (1–2) || Sabathia (1–2) || Mujica (1) || Yankee Stadium || 44,121 || 5–6 || W1
|- style="text-align:center; background-color:#ffbbbb;"
| 12 || April 12 || @ Yankees || 4–7 || Kuroda (2–1) || Lackey (2–1) || Kelley (2) || Yankee Stadium || 48,572 || 5–7 || L1
|- style="text-align:center; background-color:#ffbbbb;"
| 13 || April 13 || @ Yankees || 2–3 || Nova (2–1) || Doubront (1–2) || Kelley (3) || Yankee Stadium || 46,081 || 5–8 || L2
|- style="text-align:center; background-color:#ffbbbb;"
| 14 || April 15 || @ White Sox || 1–2 || Webb (1–0) || Badenhop (0–2) || || U.S. Cellular Field || 13,402 || 5–9 || L3
|- style="text-align:center; background-color:#bbffbb;"
| 15  || April 16 || @ White Sox || 6–4 (14) || Capuano (1–0) || García (0–1) || Badenhop (1) || U.S. Cellular Field || 13,302 || 6–9 || W1
|- style="text-align:center; background-color:#bbffbb;"
| 16 || April 17 || @ White Sox || 3–1 || Lester (2–2) || Belisario (1–2) || Uehara (3)|| U.S. Cellular Field || 17,454 || 7–9 || W2
|- style="text-align:center; background-color:#ffbbbb;"
| 17 || April 18 || Orioles || 4–8 || Tillman (2–1) || Lackey (2–2) || O'Day (1) || Fenway Park || 36,408 || 7–10 || L1
|- style="text-align:center; background-color:#bbffbb;"
| 18 || April 19 || Orioles || 4–2 || Tazawa (1–0) || Norris (0–2) || Uehara (4) || Fenway Park || 37,689  || 8–10 || W1
|- style="text-align:center; background-color:#bbffbb;"
| 19 || April 20 || Orioles || 6–5 || Mujica (1–1) || Matusz (1–1) || || Fenway Park || 33,947 || 9–10 || W2
|- style="text-align:center; background-color:#ffbbbb;"
| 20 || April 21 || Orioles || 6–7 || Chen (3–1) || Buchholz (0–2) || Hunter (5) || Fenway Park || 37,513 || 9–11 || L1
|- style="text-align:center; background-color:#ffbbbb;"
| 21 || April 22 || Yankees || 3–9 || Tanaka (3–0) || Lester (2–3) || || Fenway Park || 37,041 || 9–12 || L2
|- style="text-align:center; background-color:#bbffbb;"
| 22 || April 23 || Yankees || 5–1 || Lackey (3–2) || Pineda (2–2) || || Fenway Park || 37,015 || 10–12 || W1
|- style="text-align:center; background-color:#ffbbbb;"
| 23 || April 24 || Yankees || 5–14 || Sabathia (3–2) || Doubront (1–3) || || Fenway Park || 37,356 || 10–13 || L1
|- style="text-align:center; background-color:#bbffbb;"
| 24 || April 25 || @ Blue Jays || 8–1 || Peavy (1–0) || Buehrle (4–1) || || Rogers Centre || 29,411 || 11–13 || W1
|- style="text-align:center; background-color:#bbffbb;"
| 25 || April 26 || @ Blue Jays || 7–6 || Buchholz (1-2) || Morrow (1-2) || Uehara (5) || Rogers Centre || 40,322 || 12–13 || W2
|- style="text-align:center; background-color:#ffbbbb;"
| 26 || April 27 || @ Blue Jays || 1–7 || Dickey (2–3) || Lester (2–4) || || Rogers Centre || 45,260 || 12–14 || L1
|- style="text-align:center; background-color:#bbffbb;"
| 27 || April 29 || Rays || 7–4 || Lackey (4–2) || Gomes (1–1) || Uehara (6) || Fenway Park || 34,794 || 13–14 || W1
|- style="text-align:center; background-color:#bbbbbb"
| — || April 30 || Rays ||colspan="8" | Postponed (rain) (Makeup date: May 1)
|-

|- style="text-align:center; background-color:#ffbbbb;"
| 28 || May 1 || Rays || 1–2 || Gomes (2–1) || Peavy (1–1) || Balfour (5) || Fenway Park || 35,621 || 13–15 || L1
|- style="text-align:center; background-color:#ffbbbb;"
| 29 || May 1 || Rays || 5–6 || McGee (2–0) || Uehara (0–1) || Balfour (6) || Fenway Park || 33,465 || 13–16 || L2
|- style="text-align:center; background-color:#bbffbb;"
| 30 || May 2 || Athletics || 7–1 || Buchholz (2–2) || Straily (1–2) || || Fenway Park || 34,850 || 14–16 || W1
|- style="text-align:center; background-color:#bbffbb;"
| 31 || May 3 || Athletics || 6–3 || Lester (3–4) || Milone (0–3) || Uehara (7) || Fenway Park || 37,042 || 15–16 || W2
|- style="text-align:center; background-color:#ffbbbb;"
| 32 || May 4 || Athletics || 2–3 (10) || Johnson (3–2) || Capuano (1–1) || || Fenway Park || 35,649 || 15–17 || L1
|- style="text-align:center; background-color:#bbffbb;"
| 33  || May 6 || Reds || 4–3 (12) || Breslow (1–0) || Ondrusek (0–2) ||  || Fenway Park || 36,004 || 16–17 || W1
|- style="text-align:center; background-color:#bbffbb;"
| 34 || May 7 || Reds || 4–3 || Breslow (2–0) || Hoover (1–4) || Uehara (8) || Fenway Park || 37,072 || 17–17 || W2
|- style="text-align:center; background-color:#ffbbbb;"
| 35 || May 9 || @ Rangers || 0–8 || Darvish (3–1) || Buchholz (2–3) || || Globe Life Park || 45,392 || 17–18 || L1
|- style="text-align:center; background-color:#bbffbb;"
| 36 || May 10 || @ Rangers || 8–3 || Lester (4–4) || Pérez (4–3) || || Globe Life Park || 47,964 || 18–18 || W1
|- style="text-align:center; background-color:#bbffbb;"
| 37 || May 11 || @ Rangers || 5–2 || Lackey (5–2) || Ross (1–4) || Uehara (9) || Globe Life Park || 41,407 || 19–18 || W2
|- style="text-align:center; background-color:#ffbbbb;"
| 38 || May 13 || @ Twins || 6–8 || Perkins (1–0) || Miller (1–1) || || Target Field || 23,949 || 19–19 || L1
|- style="text-align:center; background-color:#bbffbb;"
| 39 || May 14 || @ Twins || 9–4 || Doubront (2–3) || Correia (1–5) || || Target Field || 26,802 || 20–19 || W1
|- style="text-align:center; background-color:#ffbbbb;"
| 40 || May 15 || @ Twins || 3–4 (10) || Duensing (1–2) || Miller (1–2) || || Target Field || 29,628 || 20–20 || L1
|- style="text-align:center; background-color:#ffbbbb;"
| 41 || May 16 || Tigers || 0–1 || Scherzer (6–1) || Lester (4–5) || Nathan (11) || Fenway Park || 37,225 || 20–21 || L2
|- style="text-align:center; background-color:#ffbbbb;"
| 42 || May 17 || Tigers || 1–6 || Porcello (7–1) || Lackey (5–3) ||  || Fenway Park || 37,608 || 20–22 || L3
|- style="text-align:center; background-color:#ffbbbb;"
| 43 || May 18 || Tigers || 2–6 || Sánchez (1–2) || Peavy (1–2) || || Fenway Park || 35,006 || 20–23 || L4
|- style="text-align:center; background-color:#ffbbbb;"
| 44 || May 20 || Blue Jays || 4–7 || Happ (3–1) || Doubront (2–4) || Janssen (4) || Fenway Park || 37,904 || 20–24 || L5
|- style="text-align:center; background-color:#ffbbbb;"
| 45 || May 21 || Blue Jays || 4–6 || Hutchison (3–3) || Buchholz (2–4) || Janssen (5) || Fenway Park || 36,116 || 20–25 || L6
|- style="text-align:center; background-color:#ffbbbb;"
| 46 || May 22 || Blue Jays || 2–7 || Buehrle (8–1) || Lester (4–6) || || Fenway Park || 36,018 || 20–26 || L7
|- style="text-align:center; background-color:#ffbbbb;"
| 47 || May 23 || @ Rays || 0–1 || Oviedo (1–0) || Miller (1–3) ||  || Tropicana Field || 20,898 || 20–27 || L8
|- style="text-align:center; background-color:#ffbbbb;"
| 48 || May 24 || @ Rays || 5–6 (15) || Ramos (2–3) || Miller (1–4) || || Tropicana Field || 23,569 || 20–28 || L9
|- style="text-align:center; background-color:#ffbbbb;"
| 49 || May 25 || @ Rays || 5–8 || Peralta (2–3) || Breslow (2–1) || Balfour (9) || Tropicana Field || 26,199 || 20–29 || L10
|- style="text-align:center; background-color:#bbffbb;"
| 50 || May 26 || @ Braves || 8–6 || Mujica (2–1) || Thomas (1–2) || Uehara (10) || Turner Field || 48,501 || 21–29 || W1
|- style="text-align:center; background-color:#bbffbb;"
| 51 || May 27 || @ Braves || 6–3 || Lester (5–6) || Varvaro (1–1) || Uehara (11) || Turner Field || 37,168 || 22–29 || W2
|- style="text-align:center; background-color:#bbffbb;"
| 52 || May 28 || Braves || 4–0 || Lackey (6–3)||Floyd (0–2) || || Fenway Park || 36,189 || 23–29 || W3
|- style="text-align:center; background-color:#bbffbb;"
| 53  || May 29 || Braves || 4–3 || Uehara (1–1) || Kimbrel (0–1) ||  || Fenway Park || 36,292 || 24–29 || W4
|- style="text-align:center; background-color:#bbffbb;"
| 54 || May 30 || Rays || 3–2 (10) || Miller (2–4) || Oviedo (1–2) || || Fenway Park || 35,820 || 25–29 ||  W5
|- style="text-align:center; background-color:#bbffbb;"
| 55 || May 31 || Rays || 7–1 || De La Rosa (1–0) || Odorizzi (2–5) || || Fenway Park || 37,076 || 26–29 ||  W6
|-

|- style="text-align:center; background-color:#bbffbb;"
| 56 || June 1 || Rays || 4–0 || Lester (6–6) || Bédard (2–4) || || Fenway Park || 37,688 || 27–29 || W7
|- style="text-align:center; background-color:#ffbbbb;"
| 57  || June 2 || @ Indians || 2–3 || Masterson (3–4) || Lackey (6–4) || Allen (4) || Progressive Field || 14,078 || 27–30 || L1
|- style="text-align:center; background-color:#ffbbbb;"
| 58 || June 3 || @ Indians || 3–5 || Hagadone (1–0) || Peavy (1–3) || Allen (5)|| Progressive Field || 18,738 || 27–31 || L2
|- style="text-align:center; background-color:#ffbbbb;"
| 59  || June 4 || @ Indians || 4–7 (12) || Carrasco (1–3) || Mujica (2–2) ||  || Progressive Field || 20,209 || 27–32 || L3
|- style="text-align:center; background-color:#ffbbbb;"
| 60 || June 6 || @ Tigers || 2–6 || Smyly (3–4) || De La Rosa (1–1) || || Comerica Park || 39,762 || 27–33 || L4
|- style="text-align:center; background-color:#ffbbbb;"
| 61 || June 7 || @ Tigers || 6–8 || Scherzer (7–2) || Lester (6–7) || || Comerica Park || 43,359 || 27–34 || L5
|- style="text-align:center; background-color:#bbffbb;"
| 62 || June 8 || @ Tigers || 5–3 || Lackey (7–4) || Chamberlain (1–3) || Uehara (12) || Comerica Park || 33,835 || 28–34 || W1
|- style="text-align:center; background-color:#ffbbbb;"
| 63 || June 9 || @ Orioles || 0–4 || Norris (5–5) || Peavy (1–4) || || Camden Yards || 19,729 || 28–35 || L1
|- style="text-align:center; background-color:#bbffbb;"
| 64 || June 10 || @ Orioles || 1–0 || Workman (1–0) || Tillman (5–3) || Uehara (13) || Camden Yards || 24,184 || 29–35 || W1
|- style="text-align:center; background-color:#ffbbbb;"
| 65 || June 11 || @ Orioles || 0–6 || Chen (7–2) || De La Rosa (1–2) || || Camden Yards || 25,886 || 29–36 || L1
|- style="text-align:center; background-color:#bbffbb;"
| 66 || June 12 || Indians || 5–2 || Lester (7–7) || Tomlin (4–3) || Uehara (14) || Fenway Park || 37,750 || 30–36 || W1
|- style="text-align:center; background-color:#bbffbb;"
| 67 || June 13 || Indians || 10–3 || Lackey (8–4) || Masterson (4–5) || || Fenway Park || 35,772 || 31–36 || W2
|- style="text-align:center; background-color:#ffbbbb;"
| 68 || June 14 || Indians || 2–3 || Axford (2–3) || Breslow (2–2) || Allen (7) || Fenway Park || 37,181 || 31–37 || L1
|- style="text-align:center; background-color:#ffbbbb;"
| 69 || June 15 || Indians || 2–3 (11) || Allen (3–1) || Tazawa (1–1) || || Fenway Park || 37,356 || 31–38 || L2
|- style="text-align:center; background-color:#bbffbb;"
| 70 || June 16 || Twins || 1–0 || De La Rosa (2–2) || Correia (3–8) || Uehara (15) || Fenway Park || 35,693 || 32–38 || W1
|- style="text-align:center; background-color:#bbffbb;"
| 71  || June 17 || Twins || 2–1 || Lester (8–7) || Hughes (7–3) || Mujica (2) || Fenway Park || 36,835 || 33–38 || W2
|- style="text-align:center; background-color:#bbffbb;"
| 72 || June 18 || Twins || 2–1 (10) || Uehara (2–1) || Fien (3–4) || || Fenway Park || 36,489 || 34–38 || W3
|- style="text-align:center; background-color:#ffbbbb;"
| 73  || June 19 || @ Athletics || 2–4 || Kazmir (9–2) || Peavy (1–5) || Otero (1) || O.co Coliseum || 24,371 || 34–39 || L1
|- style="text-align:center; background-color:#ffbbbb;"
| 74 || June 20 || @ Athletics || 3–4 || Abad (2–2) || Miller (2–5) || Doolittle (10) || O.co Coliseum || 28,602 || 34–40 || L2
|- style="text-align:center; background-color:#ffbbbb;"
| 75 || June 21 || @ Athletics || 1–2 (10) || Otero (6–1) || Mujica (2–3) || || O.co Coliseum || 32,873 || 34–41 || L3
|- style="text-align:center; background-color:#bbffbb;"
| 76  || June 22 || @ Athletics || 7–6 (10) || Uehara (3–1) || Abad (2–3) ||  || O.co Coliseum || 36,067 || 35–41 || W1
|- style="text-align:center; background-color:#ffbbbb;"
| 77  || June 23 || @ Mariners || 3–12 || Hernández (9–2) || Lackey (8–5) ||  || Safeco Field || 26,860 || 35–42 || L1
|- style="text-align:center; background-color:#ffbbbb;"
| 78  || June 24 || @ Mariners || 2–8 || Beimel (2–1) || Peavy (1–6) ||  || Safeco Field || 20,015 || 35–43 || L2
|- style="text-align:center; background-color:#bbffbb;"
| 79  || June 25 || @ Mariners || 5–4 || Buchholz (3–4) || Iwakuma (5–4) || Uehara (16) || Safeco Field || 27,333 || 36–43 || W1
|- style="text-align:center; background-color:#ffbbbb;"
| 80 || June 27 || @ Yankees || 0–6 || Nuño (2–4) || Workman (1–1) || || Yankee Stadium || 48,522 || 36–44 || L1
|- style="text-align:center; background-color:#bbffbb;"
| 81 || June 28 || @ Yankees || 2–1 || Lester (9–7) || Tanaka (11–3) || Uehara (17) || Yankee Stadium || 48,433 || 37–44 || W1
|- style="text-align:center; background-color:#bbffbb;"
| 82  || June 29 || @ Yankees || 8–5 || Lackey (9–5) || Whitley (3–2) || Uehara (18) || Yankee Stadium || 48,124 || 38–44 || W2
|- style="text-align:center; background-color:#ffbbbb;"
| 83  || June 30 || Cubs || 0–2 || Arrieta (5–1) || Peavy (1–7) || Rondón (10) || Fenway Park || 37,814 || 38–45 || L1
|-

|- style="text-align:center; background-color:#ffbbbb;"
| 84  || July 1 || Cubs || 1–2 || Strop (1–3) || Uehara (3–2) || Rondón (11) || Fenway Park || 36,748 || 38–46 || L2
|- style="text-align:center; background-color:#ffbbbb;"
| 85  || July 2 || Cubs || 9–16 || Villanueva (4–5) || Workman (1–2) ||  || Fenway Park || 37,055 || 38–47 || L3
|- style="text-align:center; background-color:#bbbbbb;"
| 86 || July 4 || Orioles || colspan="8" | Postponed due to Hurricane/Tropical Storm Arthur.  Rescheduled for July 5 as part of a day-night doubleheader.
|- style="text-align:center; background-color:#bbffbb;"
| 86 || July 5 || Orioles || 3–2 || Uehara (4–2) || McFarland (1–2) || || Fenway Park || 35,714 || 39–47 || W1
|- style="text-align:center; background-color:#ffbbbb;"
| 87 || July 5 || Orioles || 4–7 || Brach (3–0) || Lackey (9–6) || Britton (13) || Fenway Park || 36,468 || 39–48 || L1
|- style="text-align:center; background-color:#ffbbbb;"
| 88  || July 6 || Orioles || 6–7 (12) || Brach (4–0) || Mujica (2–4) || Britton (14) || Fenway Park || 35,811 || 39–49 || L2
|- style="text-align:center; background-color:#ffbbbb;"
| 89  || July 7 || White Sox || 0–4 || Carroll (3–5) || Buchholz (3–5) ||  || Fenway Park || 35,114 || 39–50 || L3
|- style="text-align:center; background-color:#ffbbbb;"
| 90  || July 8 || White Sox || 3–8 || Danks (8–6) || Workman (1–3) ||  || Fenway Park || 35,345 || 39–51 || L4
|- style="text-align:center; background-color:#bbffbb;"
| 91  || July 9 || White Sox || 5–4 || Uehara (5–2) || Guerra (0–1) ||  || Fenway Park || 36,218 || 40–51 || W1
|- style="text-align:center; background-color:#bbffbb;"
| 92  || July 10 || White Sox || 4–3 (10) || Miller (3–5) || Belisario (3–6) ||  || Fenway Park || 37,547 || 41–51 || W2
|- style="text-align:center; background-color:#bbffbb;"
| 93  || July 11 || @ Astros || 8–3 || Lackey (10–6) || Feldman (4–6) ||  || Minute Maid Park || 27,264 || 42–51 || W3
|- style="text-align:center; background-color:#ffbbbb;"
| 94 || July 12 || @ Astros || 2–3 || Fields (2–4) || Peavy (1–8) || Qualls (10) || Minute Maid Park || 26,322 || 42–52 || L1
|- style="text-align:center; background-color:#bbffbb;"
| 95 || July 13 || @ Astros || 11–0 || Buchholz (4–5) || Peacock (3–6) || || Minute Maid Park || 20,681 || 43–52 || W1
|-  style="text-align:center; bgcolor="bbcaff"
| ASG || July 15 || All-Star Game || NL 3–5 AL || Scherzer (AL, DET) || Neshek (NL, STL) || Perkins (AL, MIN) || Target Field  ||colspan="2" | Minneapolis, MN || ASG
|- style="text-align:center; bgcolor="bbcaff"
| ASG ||colspan="10" | The Red Sox were represented in the All-Star game by Jon Lester and Koji Uehara.
|- style="text-align:center; background-color:#bbffbb;"
| 96  || July 18 || Royals || 5–4 || Buchholz (5–5) || Downs (0–3) || Uehara (19) || Fenway Park || 37,743 || 44–52 || W2
|- style="text-align:center; background-color:#bbffbb;"
| 97  || July 19 || Royals || 2–1 || De La Rosa (3–2) || Duffy (5–10) || Uehara (20) || Fenway Park || 37,878 || 45–52 || W3
|- style="text-align:center; background-color:#bbffbb;"
| 98  || July 20 || Royals || 6–0 || Lester (10–7) || Ventura (6–7) ||  || Fenway Park || 37,439 || 46–52 || W4
|- style="text-align:center; background-color:#bbffbb;"
| 99  || July 21 || @ Blue Jays || 14–1 || Lackey (11–6) || Hutchison (6–9) ||  || Rogers Centre || 27,905 || 47–52 || W5
|- style="text-align:center; background-color:#ffbbbb;"
| 100  || July 22 || @ Blue Jays || 3–7 || Happ (8–5) || Peavy (1–9) || Cecil (4) || Rogers Centre || 29,269 || 47–53 || L1
|- style="text-align:center; background-color:#ffbbbb;"
| 101  || July 23 || @ Blue Jays || 4–6 || Dickey (8–10) || Buchholz (5–6) || Janssen (15) || Rogers Centre || 35,696 || 47–54 || L2
|- style="text-align:center; background-color:#ffbbbb;"
| 102 || July 24 || @ Blue Jays || 0–8 || Stroman (6–2) || De La Rosa (3–3) || || Rogers Centre || 46,683 || 47–55 || L3
|- style="text-align:center; background-color:#ffbbbb;"
| 103 || July 25 || @ Rays || 4–6 || Price (11–7) || Tazawa (1–2) || McGee (10) || Tropicana Field || 23,136 || 47–56 || L4
|- style="text-align:center; background-color:#ffbbbb;"
| 104 || July 26 || @ Rays || 0–3 || Balfour (1–3) || Lackey (11–7) || || Tropicana Field || 26,659 || 47–57 || L5
|- style="text-align:center; background-color:#bbffbb;"
| 105 || July 27 || @ Rays || 3–2 || Webster (1–0) || Archer (6–6) || Uehara (21) || Tropicana Field || 25,221 || 48–57 || W1
|- style="text-align:center; background-color:#ffbbbb;"
| 106 || July 28 || Blue Jays || 1–14 || Dickey (9–10) || Buchholz (5–7) || || Fenway Park || 37,974 || 48–58 || L1
|- style="text-align:center; background-color:#ffbbbb;"
| 107 || July 29 || Blue Jays || 2–4 || Stroman (7–2) || De La Rosa (3–4) || Janssen (17) || Fenway Park || 38,275 || 48–59 || L2
|- style="text-align:center; background-color:#ffbbbb;"
| 108 || July 30 || Blue Jays || 1–6 || Buehrle (11–7) || Workman (1–4) || || Fenway Park || 38,203 || 48–60 || L3
|-

|- style="text-align:center; background-color:#bbffbb;"
| 109 || August 1 || Yankees || 4–3 || Ranaudo (1–0) || Capuano (1–2) || Uehara (22) || Fenway Park || 37,782 || 49–60 || W1
|- style="text-align:center; background-color:#ffbbbb;"
| 110 || August 2 || Yankees || 4–6 || Kelley (2–3) || Webster (1–1) || Robertson (28) || Fenway Park || 37,302 || 49–61 || L1
|- style="text-align:center; background-color:#ffbbbb;"
| 111 || August 3 || Yankees || 7–8 || Rogers (1–0) || Breslow (2–3) || Robertson (29) || Fenway Park || 38,035 || 49–62 || L2
|- style="text-align:center; background-color:#ffbbbb;"
| 112 || August 5 || @ Cardinals || 2–3 || Neshek (5–0) || Tazawa (1–3) || Rosenthal (35) || Busch Stadium || 43,432 || 49–63 || L3
|- style="text-align:center; background-color:#bbffbb;"
| 113 || August 6 || @ Cardinals || 2–1 || Tazawa (2–3) || Rosenthal (1–6) || Uehara (23) || Busch Stadium || 42,733 || 50–63 || W1
|- style="text-align:center; background-color:#ffbbbb;"
| 114 || August 7 || @ Cardinals || 2–5 || Wainwright (14–6) || Workman (1–5) || Neshek (3) || Busch Stadium || 44,570 || 50–64 || L1
|- style="text-align:center; background-color:#bbffbb;"
| 115 || August 8 || @ Angels || 4–2 || Webster (2–1) || Weaver (12–7) || Uehara (24) || Angel Stadium || 38,016 || 51–64 || W1
|- style="text-align:center; background-color:#ffbbbb;"
| 116 || August 9 || @ Angels || 4–5 (19) || Shoemaker (10–4) || Workman (1–6) || || Angel Stadium || 42,159 || 51–65 || L1
|- style="text-align:center; background-color:#bbffbb;"
| 117 || August 10 || @ Angels || 3–1 || De La Rosa (4–4) || Smith (4–1) || Uehara (25) || Angel Stadium || 36,300 || 52–65 || W1
|- style="text-align:center; background-color:#bbffbb;"
| 118 || August 12 || @ Reds || 3–2 || Layne (1–0) || Broxton (4–1) || Uehara (26) || Great American Ball Park || 35,903 || 53–65 || W2
|- style="text-align:center; background-color:#bbffbb;"
| 119 || August 13 || @ Reds || 5–4 || Ranaudo (2–0) || Leake (9–11) || Mujica (3) || Great American Ball Park || 32,870 || 54–65 || W3
|- style="text-align:center; background-color:#bbffbb"
| 120 || August 14 || Astros || 9–4 || Webster (3–1) || Feldman (6–9) || || Fenway Park || 38,065 || 55–65 || W4
|- style="text-align:center; background-color:#ffbbbb;"
| 121 || August 15 || Astros || 3–5 (10) || Sipp (3–2) || Breslow (2–4) || || Fenway Park || 37,016 || 55–66 || L1
|- style="text-align:center; background-color:#bbffbb;"
| 122 || August 16 || Astros || 10–7 || Wilson (1–0) || Fields (2–6) || || Fenway Park || 37,652 || 56–66 || W1
|- style="text-align:center; background-color:#ffbbbb;"
| 123 || August 17 || Astros || 1–8  || McHugh (6–9) || Kelly (2–3) ||  || Fenway Park || 36,717 || 56–67 || L1
|- style="text-align:center; background-color:#ffbbbb;"
| 124 || August 18 || Angels || 2–4 || Wilson (10–8) || Workman (1–7) || Jepsen (1) || Fenway Park || 35,170 || 56–68 || L2
|- style="text-align:center; background-color:#ffbbbb;"
| 125 || August 19 || Angels || 3–4 || Smith (5–1) || Uehara (5–3) || Street (34) || Fenway Park || 35,471 || 56–69 || L3
|- style="text-align:center; background-color:#ffbbbb;"
| 126 || August 20 || Angels || 3–8 || Rasmus (3–1) || Buchholz (5–8) || || Fenway Park || 35,136 || 56–70 || L4
|- style="text-align:center; background-color:#ffbbbb;"
| 127 || August 21 || Angels || 0–2 || Shoemaker (12–4) || De La Rosa (4–5) || Grilli (12) || Fenway Park || 36,160 || 56–71 || L5
|- style="text-align:center; background-color:#ffbbbb;"
| 128 || August 22 || Mariners || 3–5 || Leone (6–2) || Uehara (5–4) || Rodney (37) || Fenway Park || 36,433 || 56–72 || L6
|- style="text-align:center; background-color:#ffbbbb;"
| 129 || August 23 || Mariners || 3–7 || Wilhelmsen (2–2) || Workman (1–8) || || Fenway Park || 36,905 || 56–73 || L7
|- style="text-align:center; background-color:#ffbbbb;"
| 130 || August 24 || Mariners || 6–8 || Leone (7–2) || Webster (3–2) || Rodney (38) || Fenway Park || 37,022 || 56–74 || L8
|- style="text-align:center; background-color:#bbffbb;"
| 131 || August 25 || @ Blue Jays || 4–3 (10) || Uehara (6–4) || Sanchez (2–1) || Breslow (1) || Rogers Centre || 26,041 || 57–74 || W1
|- style="text-align:center; background-color:#bbffbb;"
| 132 || August 26 || @ Blue Jays || 11–7 (11) || Tazawa (3–3) || Janssen (3–2) || || Rogers Centre || 27,321 || 58–74 || W2
|- style="text-align:center; background-color:#ffbbbb;"
| 133 || August 27 || @ Blue Jays || 2–5 || Stroman (8–5) || Layne (1–1) || Cecil (5) || Rogers Centre || 30,285 || 58–75 || L1
|- style="text-align:center; background-color:#bbffbb;"
| 134 || August 29 || @ Rays || 8–4 || Ranaudo (3–0) || Archer (8–7) || || Tropicana Field || 16,107 || 59–75 || W1
|- style="text-align:center; background-color:#ffbbbb;"
| 135 || August 30 || @ Rays || 0–7 || Odorizzi (10–11) || Webster (3–3) || || Tropicana Field || 17,463 || 59–76 || L1
|- style="text-align:center; background-color:#bbffbb;"
| 136 || August 31 || @ Rays || 3–0 || Buchholz (6–8) || Cobb (9–7) || || Tropicana Field || 16,822 || 60–76 || W1
|-

|- style="text-align:center; background-color:#ffbbbb;"
| 137 || September 1 || @ Rays || 3–4 (10) || Balfour (2–6) || Badenhop (0–3) || || Tropicana Field || 10,543 || 60–77 || L1
|- style="text-align:center; background-color:#bbffbb;"
| 138 || September 2 || @ Yankees || 9–4 || Kelly (3–3) || Greene (4–2) ||  || Yankee Stadium || 40,334 || 61–77 || W1
|- style="text-align:center; background-color:#ffbbbb;"
| 139 || September 3 || @ Yankees || 1–5 || Kuroda (10–8) || Ranaudo (3–1) || || Yankee Stadium || 40,007 || 61–78 || L1
|- style="text-align:center; background-color:#ffbbbb;"
| 140 || September 4 || @ Yankees || 4–5 || Warren (3–5) || Uehara (6–5) || || Yankee Stadium || 44,708 || 61–79 || L2
|- style="text-align:center; background-color:#bbffbb;"
| 141 || September 5 || Blue Jays || 9–8 (10) || Layne (2–1) || Janssen (3–3) || || Fenway Park || 35,667 || 62–79 || W1
|- style="text-align:center; background-color:#bbffbb;"
| 142 || September 6 || Blue Jays || 4–3 || Buchholz (7–8) || Happ (9–9) || Mujica (4) || Fenway Park || 36,677 || 63–79 || W2
|- style="text-align:center; background-color:#ffbbbb;"
| 143 || September 7 || Blue Jays || 1–3 || Dickey (12–12) || De La Rosa (4–6) || Janssen (22) || Fenway Park || 36,261 || 63–80 || L1
|- style="text-align:center; background-color:#ffbbbb;"
| 144 || September 8 || Orioles || 0–4 || González (9–7) || Kelly (3–4) || || Fenway Park || 35,894 || 63–81 || L2
|- style="text-align:center; background-color:#ffbbbb;"
| 145 || September 9 || Orioles || 1–4 || Tillman (12–5) || Ranaudo (3–2) || Britton (34) || Fenway Park || 37,008 || 63–82 || L3
|-  align="center" style="background: #993333; color: white"
| 146 || September 10 || Orioles || 6–10 || Chen (15–4) || Workman (1–9) ||  || Fenway Park || 35,374 || 63–83 || L4
|- style="text-align:center; background-color:#bbffbb;"
| 147 || September 11 || @ Royals || 6–3 || Buchholz (8–8) || Hendriks (1–2) || Mujica (5) || Kauffman Stadium || 28,673 || 64–83 || W1
|- style="text-align:center; background-color:#bbffbb;"
| 148 || September 12 || @ Royals || 4–2 || Webster (4–3) || Ventura (12–10) || Mujica (6) || Kauffman Stadium || 19,191 || 65–83 || W2
|- style="text-align:center; background-color:#ffbbbb;"
| 149 || September 13 || @ Royals || 1–7 || Guthrie (11–11) ||  De La Rosa (4–7) ||  || Kauffman Stadium || 26,627 || 65–84 || L1
|- style="text-align:center; background-color:#bbffbb;"
| 150 || September 14 || @ Royals || 8–4 || Kelly (4–4) || Vargas (11–9) || || Kauffman Stadium || 19,065 || 66–84 || W1
|- style="text-align:center; background-color:#ffbbbb;"
| 151 || September 16 || @ Pirates || 0–4 || Morton (6–12) || Ranaudo (3–3) || || PNC Park || 34,698 || 66–85 || L1
|- style="text-align:center; background-color:#ffbbbb;"
| 152 || September 17 || @ Pirates || 1–9 || Liriano (6–10) || Buchholz (8–9) || || PNC Park || 34,785 || 66–86 || L2
|- style="text-align:center; background-color:#ffbbbb;"
| 153 || September 18 || @ Pirates || 2–3 || Cole (10–5) || Workman (1–10) || Melancon (30) || PNC Park || 36,862 || 66–87 || L3
|- style="text-align:center; background-color:#bbffbb;"
| 154 || September 19 || @ Orioles || 5–3 (10) || Tazawa (4–3) || O'Day (5–2) || Mujica (7) || Camden Yards || 39,079 || 67–87 || W1
|- style="text-align:center; background-color:#ffbbbb;"
| 155 || September 20 || @ Orioles || 2–7 || Tillman (13–5) || De La Rosa (4–8) || || Camden Yards || 43,015 || 67–88 || L1
|- style="text-align:center; background-color:#bbffbb;"
| 156 || September 21 || @ Orioles || 3–2 || Kelly (5–4) || González (9–9) || Mujica (8) || Camden Yards || 38,329 || 68–88 || W1
|- style="text-align:center; background-color:#ffbbbb;"
| 157 || September 23 || Rays || 2–6 || Cobb (10–8) || Buchholz (8–10) || || Fenway Park || 35,566 || 68–89 || L1
|- style="text-align:center; background-color:#bbffbb;"
| 158 || September 24 || Rays || 11–3 || Ranaudo (4–3) || Odorizzi (11–13) || || Fenway Park || 35,741 || 69–89 || W1
|- style="text-align:center; background-color:#bbffbb;"
| 159 || September 25 || Rays || 11–1 || Webster (5–3) || Hellickson (1–5) || || Fenway Park || 36,590 || 70–89 || W2
|- style="text-align:center; background-color:#ffbbbb;"
| 160 || September 26 || Yankees || 2–3 || Capuano (3–4) || Wright (0–1) || Robertson (39) || Fenway Park || 37,605 || 70–90 || L1
|- style="text-align:center; background-color:#bbffbb;"
| 161 || September 27 || Yankees || 10–4 || Kelly (6–4) || Tanaka (13–5) || || Fenway Park || 37,147 || 71–90 || W1
|- style="text-align:center; background-color:#ffbbbb;"
| 162 || September 28 || Yankees || 5–9 ||Pineda (5–5) ||Buchholz (8–11) || || Fenway Park ||36,879 || 71–91 ||L1
|-

|Reference:

Awards and honors
 Dustin Pedroia – Gold Glove Award (2B)

All-Star Game
 Jon Lester, reserve P
 Koji Uehara, reserve P (roster replacement)

Farm system

Source:

LEAGUE CHAMPIONS: Pawtucket, GCL Red Sox

References

External links

2014 Boston Red Sox at Baseball Reference
2014 Boston Red Sox season at Official Site
2014 Boston Red Sox season at ESPN
2014 Boston Red Sox Media Guide
2014 Boston Red Sox Draft Selections

Boston Red Sox
Red Sox
Boston Red Sox
Boston Red Sox seasons